Walter Pullar Cameron (13 November 1896 – 22 April 1957) was an Australian rules footballer who played with St Kilda in the VFL during the 1920s.

Camerson started his career with St Kilda in 1920 and won their Club Champion award in his debut season.

References

External links

1896 births
1957 deaths
Australian rules footballers from Victoria (Australia)
St Kilda Football Club players
Trevor Barker Award winners
Australian military personnel of World War I